VCU Rams volleyball may refer to:

 VCU Rams men's volleyball, a club team at Virginia Commonwealth University that represents the school in men's club competitions
 VCU Rams women's volleyball, a varsity team also at VCU that represents the school in women's varsity competitions